

Play-by-play
Sam Balter
Paul Burmeister
Jac Collinsworth
Bob Costas
Don Criqui      
Dick Enberg 
Bill Flemming
Curt Gowdy  
Tom Hammond 
Tom Harmon
Joe Hasel
Chick Hearn
Dan Hicks
Charlie Jones
Jim Lampley
Joel Meyers
Al Michaels
Lindsey Nelson
Ray Scott
Jim Simpson
Bill Stern
Mike Tirico

Color commentary
Frankie Albert
Elmer Angsman
Drew Brees
Terry Brennan
John Brodie
Jimmy Cefalo 
Paul Christman
Todd Christensen
Cris Collinsworth
Randy Cross
Len Dawson
Al DeRogatis 
Tony Dungy
Doug Flutie
Jason Garrett
Lee Giroux
Red Grange
Pat Haden
Mike Haffner
James Lofton
Paul Maguire
Mike Mayock
Joe Namath
Merlin Olsen
Ahmad Rashad
George Ratterman
Kyle Rote 
Sam Rutigliano
Bob Teague
Bob Trumpy
Bill Walsh
Bud Wilkinson

Sideline reporters
Jimmy Cefalo 
John Dockery 
Alex Flanagan
Lewis Johnson
Paul Maguire
Craig Sager
O. J. Simpson
Zora Stephenson
Kathryn Tappen

Studio hosts
Jac Collinsworth
Liam McHugh
Kathryn Tappen

Studio analysts
Doug Flutie
Dhani Jones
Corey Robinson
Chris Simms
Jonathan Vilma
Hines Ward

See also
Notre Dame Football on NBC
List of Cotton Bowl broadcasters
List of Fiesta Bowl broadcasters
List of Gator Bowl broadcasters
List of Orange Bowl broadcasters
List of Outback Bowl broadcasters
List of Rose Bowl broadcasters
List of Sugar Bowl broadcasters

College Football personalities
NBC